Ghatghar is a hill station and small town in the Ahmadnagar district in the Indian state of Maharashtra. It is a town located at a higher elevation of Deccan Plateau and Naneghat valley. There are two Ghatghar Dams.

Hill stations in Maharashtra
Cities and towns in Pune district